Amidostomum is a genus of nematodes belonging to the family Amidostomatidae.

The genus has cosmopolitan distribution.

Species:

Amidostomum acutum 
Amidostomum anseris 
Amidostomum cygni 
Amidostomum fulicae 
Amidostomum henryi 
Amidostomum spatulatum

References

Nematodes